God of the Sullied is an Indian national bestselling historical (mythological) novel written by Gaurav Sharma. It is the first book of The Sullied Warrior Duology and has a sequel, Long Live the Sullied. God of the Sullied is set in the ninth-century Indian state of Rudraputra (fictional location). Several rejections of this book's manuscript resulted in the creation of the book The Indian Story of an Author, a symbolic protest by Gaurav Sharma.

Publication
The first edition of  God of the Sullied was published in September 2018 by Think Tank Books, a Delhi-based publishing house. The Hindi translation of the book by the author came out in September 2020 as Charitranayak Eklavya.

Synopsis
God of the Sullied is a story about an underachieving, innocent and supposedly cursed child, who in the end, conquers the world and demolishes the evil. The story revolves around ninth century India, just after the sudden demise of Adi Shankaracharya – a time when a unique and exotic Ikshavaku tribe lives somewhere in Rudraputra. Their scion, Eklavya, as per the predictions of Maha-Purohit (high priest), would take birth with a purpose of demolishing the evil from the earth. The child is declared mystic. However, he would later be clutched in the hands of Kali, the darkness.

Reception
 The New Indian Express called this book "the kind of book you should curl up, with a hot cup of coffee on your bedside table."
 United News of India commented, "The moment you think you can predict the next chapter of the book, dramatic twists that Sharma cohesively puts into this novel will leave you flabbergasted."

Main characters
 Eklavya, protagonist
 Vyas, Father of Eklavya
 Sumati, Mother of Eklavya
 Maha-Purohit, high priest of the province of Rudraputra
 Maha-Mantri, chief minister of the state
 Mohammad (enigma)
 Old Man (name unknown)
 Tara (Tribal Girl)
 Acharya Virbhadra
 Acharya Kaushal
 Acharya Bhushan
Sarpanch (name unknown)

References

2018 Indian novels
Indian historical novels
Hindu mythology in popular culture
2018 fantasy novels
Indian English-language novels